The year 1934 in archaeology involved some significant events.

Explorations
 Maya site of Becan rediscovered by archaeologists Karl Ruppert and John Denison.

Excavations
 Poznań University project at Biskupin begins, led by Józef Kostrzewski and Zdzisław Rajewski.
 Snaketown, Arizona, under direction of Harold S. Galdwin.
 Kennet Avenue, by Alexander Keiller (continues to 1935).
 Maiden Castle, Dorset, by Mortimer Wheeler (continues to 1937).
 Persepolis, by Erich Schmidt (continues to 1939).
 Qafzeh cave excavations at Mount Precipice begin, led by René Neuville, uncovering remains of Hominidae dated to ca. 95,000 years BP.
 The site of the statue of the Warrior of Capestrano, accidentally discovered this year, is investigated by Giuseppe Moretti.
 Viking Age ruins at Igaliku in Greenland, by Aage Roussell, Eigil Knuth and Poul Nørlund.

Finds
 2 January: Warka Vase found at Uruk.
 The Statue of Ebih-Il is unearthed in Mari, Syria, by a French team.

Publications

Events
 Russian paleophytologist V. A. Petrov sees a Latin stone inscription near Füzuli, Azerbaijan, mentioning Legio XII Fulminata; its exact location is unknown.

Births
 January 1 - Khaled al-Asaad, Syrian archaeologist (d. 2015)
 May 13 - Ehud Netzer, Professor of archeology at Hebrew University known for his excavations related to Herod the Great (d. 2010)
 August 11 - Graham Connah, English-born archaeologist
 September 2 - Donald B. Redford, Canadian Egyptologist
 September 4 - Giovanni Colonna, Italian archaeologist of the Etruscan civilization

Deaths
January 29 - Albert Lythgoe, American Egyptologist, curator of the New York Metropolitan Museum (b. 1868)
 March 14 - Francis Llewellyn Griffith, British Egyptologist (b. 1862)
 March 15 - Davidson Black, Canadian paleoanthropologist (b. 1884)
 November 23 - E. A. Wallis Budge, English Egyptologist. (b. 1857)

References

Archaeology
Archaeology
Archaeology by year